Tektronix vintage analog oscilloscopes technologies and evolution.  The company was founded in the mid-1940s to produce oscilloscopes.

400 series

Portable scopes  
 In the 1960s Tektronix introduced the relatively compact 450 series, starting with the 50 MHz 453. 
The 453 was superseded by the 454. There was also a 422 15MHz AC/DC portable made.

These were quickly followed by the 460 series, the 470 series, and the 480 series. 
Each upgrade resulted in wider bandwidth and better triggering.
These were still heavy little scopes, and the chassis was complicated and expensive to build.

Notable with these portable models is the abundance of offerings and option choices.  From 500 kHz bandwidth all the way to 400 MHz. In 1988, prices started at about $2000, and went to $12,000+ for the 2467 with MCP CRT, all with 2 to 4 channels. Weight went from a light 3.5 lbs for the diminutive 212 all the way to 24 lbs for the 2467.

These scopes come in many different models and the differences between them are not obvious.

500 series

501 oscilloscope 
 The first number "5" stood for the screen's diameter, "01" indicated the first model. The early 501 contained advanced circuitry but it was too big and heavy on the bench. That was not enough to compete against the "big" competitors like Dumont, RCA, Varian, General Electric(?). Tektronix realized these drawbacks, and introduced the model 511 (designed by Howard Vollum, Milt Bave and others)

511 oscilloscope

547 oscilloscope 
 
The 547 was perhaps the most popular of the large size, vacuum tube type oscilloscopes. It was a single beam oscilloscope costing $1875 in 1968.
The 547 was made popular largely because of the innovative "ALT" mode, which allowed for dual traces to be shown on a single beam oscilloscope, providing much of the functionality of dual-beam scopes for a fraction of the added cost.

It was of interest to many users to be able to see more than one electrical signal on the screen at the same time, so they could be easily compared or correlated.  
There were two methods of doing this. One was a dual-beam oscilloscope. 
This was a very expensive approach, as two of everything was required. 
Tektronix oscilloscopes like this were the 502, 551, 555, and 556. Some of these had two time bases and two sets of horizontal deflection plates, so the horizontal scan of the two beams could be synchronized (triggered) separately from the other.

Another way to do the same thing was to use an electronic switch in front of the vertical system in a single beam oscilloscope. This is called a "dual trace" oscilloscope. The switch worked to display 2 or 4 separate electrical signals on the screen. This required little duplication and added only a small amount to the cost. This is the technique used in all the dual and four-trace plug-ins such as the CA, 1A1, 1A2, Type M and 1A4.

2000 series 

 The first 2000-series Tektronix oscilloscopes were introduced in the 1982 catalog. New models available that year were the 2213, 2215, 2335, 2336, and 2337. They offered excellent portability along with light weight and low power consumption. Very rugged, they were rated to withstand 50g. Most of this was due to the simplification of circuit design, and a lightweight switching power supply. They were significantly lighter than the  400-series.

These early models were limited in bandwidth, but in 1984, that changed with the introduction of the 2465 and little brother, the 2445. Both models had 4 channels, but the 2465 bandwidth was 300 MHz, with triggering to match. Completely microprocessor driven and firmware controlled, these were a new breed, similar in appearance but not otherwise related to the 2200 scopes. By 1989, the 2465B had 400 MHz bandwidth with triggering beyond 500 MHz.

The peak of the 2000-series  seems to be in 1984, when there were no less than 21 models introduced for a total of 33 models offered. The 2430, the 2432A, the 2465B and the 2467B lasted until 1996. By the 1997 catalog, there were no longer 2000-series listed. Indicating a long 14 year production run.

The main differences between the non-storage, non-digital analog 2200 series are as follows: the 2200 series is mostly 2 channel, with 2245, 2246, 2247, and 2252 being the 4 channel exceptions (the two extra channels having only two vertical attenuation values). The 2335 and 2336 are 2 channel, ruggedized versions mostly made for the military. The 2400 series are 4 channel, 2 of the channels having full attenuators. Otherwise, the main difference is bandwidth. The 2200 series is 20 - 100 MHz. The 2400 series starts out at 150 MHz (2445, 2445A) but goes up with the 2445B; 150 MHz for early units, 200 MHz for late units. The 2465 has a bandwidth of 300 MHz, the 2465A 350 MHz, the 2465B 400 MHz.

The 2467 is a special case, having a micro-channel plate (MCP) CRT. This oscilloscope offers extremely high speed writing, making one-shot pulses at nanosecond duration visible in normal room light. In that aspect it was the only non-storage CRT to be able to do this. The same type of crt was used in the 7104.

Year introduced 
Years in which the various models were introduced according to the Tektronix catalogs:
 1982: 2213, 2215, 2335, 2336, 2337 (first models)
 1983: (no new models)
 1984: 2235, 2236, 2445, 2465
 1985: 2213A, 2215A, 2235L, 2236/01, 2465CTS, 2465DMS, 2465DVS
 1986: 2220, 2230, 2430
 1987: 2225, 2245, 2246, 2430M, 2445A, 2455A, 2465A, 2465A-CT and -DM and -DV, 2467
 1988: 2235/01, 2246/1Y, 2430A
 1989: 2201, 2205, 2210, 2245A, 2246A, 2246/1Y, 2247A, 2402, 2432A, 2440, 2465B, 2445B, 2465BCT, 2465BDM, 2465BDV, 2467B
 1990: 2211, 2232, 2235A, 2235A/01, 2235L, 2236A, 2431L
 1991: 2221A, 2252, 2402A, 2439, 2467BHD

By 1994, the decline had started, no new 2000 models being listed after that, and by 1996, only the 2430A, 2440, 2465B, and 2467B were being offered. The TDS series had completely replaced the 2000 series.

The 2247 and 2252 are very similar. The difference is that the 2252 has printing and programmable setups, useful in many applications. Both are excellent scopes.

Oscilloscopes with cursors include the 2246, 2252, and all of the 2400 series (2445, 2465, 2467). 
Cursors allow doing measurements that are independent of the graticule. With a cursor-equipped scope, the user can accurately and quickly measure, as a minimum, voltage, time, and frequency of all or parts of the waveform. Accuracy varies, but even the most basic cursors give more accurate results than taking readings from the graticule. The TAS 465, an inexpensive analog 100 MHz scope, also has a cursor system. The 2445, 2465 and 2467 have an option called CTT, which links a highly accurate frequency counter with the cursor and readout system.

The storage scopes go even further with various systems of parameter extraction.  Because the waveform is a slice of time, digitized and stored in the scope's memory, the scope can work on that one set of data. In a flash, as many as twenty parameters, or attributes, of the signal can be derived and displayed on the screen. Scopes that can do parameter extraction may also be able to communicate to a computer over a GPIB setup, and do even more advanced math on the waveform. These include the 2430, 2432, and 2440 digital storage oscilloscopes.

2400 series 

 The Tektronix 2400 Series oscilloscopes were perhaps the most powerful instruments of their time, with the 2445, 2465, and 2467 being the top-end models and the 2430 series of digitizing storage oscilloscopes providing digital storage. They combined high bandwidth and sampling rates with automation features and waveform processing capabilities. In 1991, four models were available: 2430A, 2431L, 2432A, and 2440. Together with the 2402 and a PC, they constitute a complete waveform processing and analysis system.

Models
 2430A: sampling rate 100 MS/sec, bandwidth 150 MHz
 2431L: sampling rate 250 MS/sec, bandwidth 300 MHz (no delay sweep, no glitch capture, limited AUTO SETUP)
 2432A: sampling rate 250 MS/sec, bandwidth 300 MHz
 2439: sampling rate 500 MS/sec, bandwidth 300 MHz (no delay sweep, no glitch capture, limited AUTO SETUP)
 2440: sampling rate 500 MS/sec, bandwidth 300 MHz
 2445: analog scope, bandwidth 150 MHz
 2445B: analog scope, bandwidth 150 MHz
 2455B: analog scope, bandwidth 250 MHz
 2465: analog scope, bandwidth 300 MHz
 2465A: analog scope, bandwidth 350 MHz
 2465B: analog scope, bandwidth 400 MHz
 2467: analog scope, bandwidth 350 MHz
 2467B: analog scope, bandwidth 400 MHz

Options 
The important oscilloscope options are:
 01 - Digital Multimeter
 03 - Word Recognizer Probe Pod (P6407)
 05 - Video Waveform Measurement System
 06 - Counter/Timer/Trigger (CTT)
 09 - Counter/Timer/Trigger (CTT) with Word Recognizer (WR)
 10 - GPIB Interface
 11 - Probe Power
 1E - External Clock
 22 - Two additional Probes
 1R - Prep for rack mounting kit

TekMate 2402 and 2402A
The 2402 TekMate instrument extension is really an IBM clone computer that uses the oscilloscope as both keyboard and monitor. The 2402 has two floppy drives; the 2402A could be had with a hard drive in place of the second floppy. The 2402 communicates with the scope on the GPIB bus, and will transfer waveform data, programs and front panel setups both directions. Waveforms can be stored on floppy disks, processed by software in the 2402, and reloaded into the scope for display. As many waveforms can be stored as one has disks to store them on.

The processor in the 2402 is an Ampro LittleBoard/PC running the NEC V40 CPU at 7.16 MHz.  The processor in the 2402A is an Ampro LittleBoard/286 running at 16 MHz. They each come with about 1 MB of RAM.

Keyboard
A standard IBM PC/XT keyboard can be plugged into the 2402.  The 2402A requires a PC/AT keyboard. It does not appear to be necessary however. All functions can be executed from menus on the oscilloscope itself.

Monitor
The 2402 had a 9-pin female connector for a CGA monitor. The 2402A had an EGA card.

Probes
Supplied probe was the P6137, a highly sophisticated probe featuring 10X, 400 MHz bandwidth with readout capability and auto setup activation

Printers and plotters
HC100 Color Plotter.
The HC100 is a four-color plotter designed to make waveform plots directly from the Tektronix 2430-series oscilloscopes. It does not require an intervening controller. Under program control from the instrument attached by a GPIB cable, front panel commands can be used to plot digitally stored waveforms and printouts of instrument setup information. They are sometimes for sale, but do not always have the required GPIB interface.

HC200 Dot Matrix Printer.
This unit can be used to produce waveform plots as well as capturing setup information. It can be attached directly to the scope with a printer cable, so a GPIB is not required.

7000 series 

 
The 7000 series, a high end modular oscilloscope family, was introduced in the early 1970s. The series included a readout system that would display the plug in's settings on the CRT.
 
Some conventional single-beam oscilloscope models were the 7603 ($2,700 in 1983), 7704, 7704A (250-MHz BW, $4,260), 7904 (500-MHz BW, $8,910), 7904A, and 7104 (1-GHz BW with high brightness for single shot events, $20,160). The last digit of the model number indicated the number of plug in slots the mainframe had. The 7844 ($12,665 in 1983) was a dual-beam 400-MHz BW oscilloscope. The series also included some storage scopes: 7613 (variable persistence, $5,025 in 1983), 7623, 7633 (100-MHz BW, $7,765), and 7834 (400-MHz BW, $11,705). The series also wandered into digital oscilloscope territory.  The 7854 waveform processing oscilloscope ($13,750 in 1983) could function as both an analog or a digital oscilloscope with GPIB. The 7612D programmable waveform digitizer ($26,400 in 1983) and the 7912AD programmable transient waveform digitizer ($24,800) were GPIB digitizers that did not have a display.

The 7000 series had an extensive collection of plug ins. The 7Ann plug ins were amplifiers. The 7A18A was a 75-MHz, 1-Mohm, 5-mV/div, dual-trace amplifier ($1,180 in 1983). The 7A26 was similar but had a 200-MHz bandwidth ($1,910); the 7A29 ($2,530) was a 1-GHz, 50-ohm, single-channel amplifier. The series included differential amplifiers. The 7A22 differential amplifier ($1500 in 1983) had only a 1-MHz bandwidth, but its most sensitive range was 10-µV/div. The 7A13 differential comparator ($2,865 in 1983) has a 105-MHz bandwidth. The 7A13 differential comparator amplifier can subtract a DC voltage from the input and amplify around that voltage, a feature unknown to modern digital scopes. Looking at voltage rails is a situation where the 7000 series still shows off.  For example, one could subtract the nominal core voltage (e.g. 1.1 V) and set the amplifier to 1 mV/div (finest) and see the quality of a processor's core voltage supply in detail.

The 7Bnn plug ins were intended as time bases. There were several choices to match the mainframe's bandwidth. Two time base plug ins could communicate to obtain a delayed sweep feature (e.g., 7B80 and 7B85, $1,335 and $1,605 in 1983). Some time base plug ins included a delayed sweep in one module, such as the 7B53A or 7B92A ($1,430 and $3,175 in 1983).

There were several digital or meter plug ins (7Dnn). For the first time in commercially available oscilloscopes, the 7000 series had a digital read-out system, so a plug in could display its settings or display the value of a measurement on the CRT. The 7D11 ($2,915 in 1983) was a digital delay, the 7D15 ($3,020) was a 225 MHz counter/timer, the 7D13 ($1,105) was a multimeter, and the 7D12/M2 ($2,815) was a sample-and-hold with an analog-to-digital converter.  More exotic digital plug ins used the mainframe oscilloscope as a mere display unit. The 7D01 and 7D02 were logic analyzer plug ins.  The triple-wide 7D20 programmable digitizer with GPIB ($7,750 in 1983) would turn an analog mainframe into a digital scope.

The series also had some sampling technology plug ins, and many plug ins of this group used the S-series sampling and pulse generator heads. (The S-series sampling heads were used in the Tektronix 560-series sampling plug ins such as the 3S2, 3S5, 3S6). The 7S11 sampling unit ($1,780) was intended for a mainframe's vertical axis slot; it would take an S-series head, and that head would determine the bandwidth. The S-1 sampling head ($1,160 in 1983) had a 1 GHz bandwidth; the S-4 sampling head ($2,665) had a 25 ps risetime 12.4 GHz bandwidth traveling-wave sampler. The 7S11 would work in combination with the 7T11 ($4,460 in 1983) or 7T11A sampling sweep units as a time base. The 7T11 could trigger on a 1 GHz signal or it could synchronize to a 1 GHz to 12.4 GHz input. The 7S12 TDR/Sampler ($3,390 in 1983) was a double-wide time domain reflectometry plug in; it needed both a sampling head (such as the S-6 30 ps risetime 11.5 GHz pass through sampler, $2,295 in 1983) and a pulse generator (such as the S-52 25 ps risetime tunnel diode generator, $1,655 in 1983).  The 7S12 could also perform as a sampling scope with a sampling head and a trigger recognizer head (S-53). The 7S14 dual trace delayed sweep sampler ($5,235 in 1983) was a complete 1 GHz sampler that did not use any S-series sampling heads.

There were also a curve tracer plug in, the 7CT1N ($1,385 in 1983), and spectrum analyzer plug ins (e.g., 7L5, 7L12, 7L13, 7L14, 7L18). Combining a 7000-series storage oscilloscope mainframe with a non-storage spectrum analyzer plug in (7L12, 7L13) allowed a slow sweep with a display that did not fade away. The 7L5, 7L14 and 7L18 had their own internal digital storage and were capable of showing a stable display even when used in non-storage mainframes.

GPIB bus

In 1965, Hewlett-Packard designed the Hewlett-Packard Interface Bus ( HP-IB ) to connect their line of programmable instruments to their computers. Because of its high transfer rate at the time (nominally 1 Mbytes/s), this interface bus quickly gained popularity. It was later accepted as IEEE Standard 488-1975, and has evolved to ANSI/IEEE Standard 488.1-1987. Today, the name General Purpose Interface Bus (GPIB) is more widely used than HP-IB. ANSI/IEEE 488.2-1987 strengthened the original standard by defining precisely how controllers and instruments communicate. Standard Commands for Programmable Instruments (SCPI) took the command structures defined in IEEE 488.2 and created a single, comprehensive programming command set that is used with any SCPI instrument. Many Tektronix instruments, including the 2430-series oscilloscopes, are available with GPIB interface cards.

References

External links 

 TekWiki
 Near The Beginning of an era, The Tektronix 511A
 VintageTEK
 Classic Tektronix Scopes
 History of Tektronix 
 radiomuseum.org Catalog for Textronix
 Tips For Repairing Tektronix 2445, 2465, 2467

Tektronix
Electronic test equipment